Kiso may refer to:

Geography
 Kiso, Nagano (village), a village in Kiso District, Nagano
 Kiso, Nagano (town), a town in Kiso District, Nagano
 Kiso District, Nagano, a district located in Nagano Prefecture, Japan.
 Kiso Mountains, a mountain range in Nagano and Gifu prefectures in Japan
 Kiso Observatory, an astronomical observatory located at Mt. Ontake in Japan
 Kiso River, a river in Japan
 Kiso Valley

Other
 Japanese cruiser Kiso
 Kisō (Demonic Burial), an album by Dir en grey
 KISO (FM), a radio station (96.1 FM) licensed to serve Omaha, Nebraska, United States
The ICAO airport code for Kinston Regional Jetport